Spellbound is the fourth studio album released by the hard rock band Ten.

Track listing
All songs written by Gary Hughes except where noted.

 "March of the Argonauts" (Instrumental) – 2:14
 "Fear the Force" – 5:36
 "Inside the Pyramid of Light" – 4:17 (Hughes, Vinny Burns)
 "Spellbound" – 5:15
 "We Rule the Night" – 5:29
 "Remembrance for the Brave" (Instrumental) – 1:18
 "Red" – 4:15
 "The Alchemist" – 5:09
 "Wonderland" – 5:01
 "Eclipse" – 4:14
 "The Phantom" – 6:15
 "Till the End of Time" – 4:58
NEMS version (NEMS 104) adds
"Gimme a Piece of Your Heart" – 5:39 (Hughes, Burns)
 "When Only Love Can Ease the Pain" – 5:58
 "Can't Slow Down" (Live version) – 6:26
2016 japanese SHM-CD remaster (AVALON MICP-11297) bonus track:
"Time" - 7:36

Personnel
Gary Hughes – vocals 
Vinny Burns – Lead guitars
John Halliwell – Rhythm guitars
Ged Rylands – keyboards
Steve McKenna – bass guitar
Greg Morgan – drums and percussion
Jason Thanos – backing vocals
Bob Catley – backing vocals (Track 5)
Sue Willets – backing vocals (Track 5)
Rafe McKenna – backing vocals (Track 5)
Francis Cummings – violin
Susan Williamson – violin
Claire McFarlane – viola
Rebecca Whettan – cello
Mike McGoldric – uilleann pipes, low whistle and bamboo flute

Production
Mixing – Rafe McKenna
Assistant Mixing – Audu Obaje and Dan Sprigg
Engineers – Audu Obaje
Assistant Engineer – Neil Amison

External links
Heavy Harmonies page

Ten (band) albums
1999 albums
Albums produced by Gary Hughes
Frontiers Records albums